was a village located in Yoshiki District, Yamaguchi Prefecture. The village was named from Hirai's 1st kanji (平井) and Kurokawa's 2nd kanji (黒川).

On April 1, 1944, the village merged with surrounding 9 municipalities to become the city of Yamaguchi and the village dissolved.

Geography

History 
 April 1, 1889 - Due to town and village status enforcement, the village was founded within Yoshiki District. At the same time, the villages of Hirai, Kurokawa, and Yoshida merges?
 April 1, 1944 - The village of Hirakawa and the surrounding 9 municipalities (city of Yamaguchi, towns of Ogōri and Ajisu, and the villages of Ōtoshi, Sue, Natajima, Aiofutajima, Kagawa and Sayama) merged to become the new city of Yamaguchi and the village of Hirakawa dissolved.

Precincts

Yoshida

Hirai

Kurokawa 
 Fukura

Current status 
The village of Hirakawa became one of the regions of the city of Yamaguchi (Hirakawa). Since the 1970s, more young people, mostly students, live in the Yoshida region because Yamaguchi University (Main Campus) has been relocated to the Yoshida Region.

See also 
 List of dissolved municipalities of Japan
 List of dissolved municipalities of Yamaguchi Prefecture

Dissolved municipalities of Yamaguchi Prefecture
village Hirakawa